Withiidae is a family of pseudoscorpions belonging to the order Pseudoscorpiones.

Genera

Genera:
 Aisthetowithius Beier, 1967
 Balanowithius Beier, 1959
 Beierowithius Mahnert, 1979

References

Pseudoscorpions
Pseudoscorpion families